Jurriën David Norman Timber (born 17 June 2001) is a Dutch professional footballer who plays as a defender for Eredivisie club Ajax and the Netherlands national team. Mainly a centre-back, he can also play as a right-back.

Timber joined Ajax's youth academy in 2014, from Feyenoord. He made his first-team debut in March 2020 and has won two Eredivisie titles and one KNVB Cup. He won the Marco van Basten Award in 2022.

Timber made 29 appearances for the Netherlands at youth international level. He was a member of the under-17 team that won the 2018 UEFA European Under-17 Championship. He made his senior international debut in June 2021.

Club career

Youth career
Timber started playing for Utrecht-based club DVSU at the age of four, before joining Feyenoord's youth system when he was six. In 2014, he joined Ajax, where he signed his first professional contract in 2018.

Ajax
Timber made his senior debut for Ajax in a 3–1 win over SC Heerenveen on 7 March 2020.

He scored his first career goal for Ajax against Emmen on 2 May 2021. It was the opening goal in an eventual 4–0 win. That result confirmed Ajax as Eredivisie champions for a record 35th time.

International career
Timber played youth international football for the Netherlands at under-15, under-16, under-17, under-19 and under-21 levels. He was selected for the senior Netherlands squad for UEFA Euro 2020. He made his debut for the team on 2 June 2021 in a friendly against Scotland, as a starter.

Personal life
Born in the Netherlands, Timber and his twin brother Quinten Timber, who is also a footballer, are of Aruban and Curaçaoan descent. Their mother Marilyn is from Aruba and their father is from Curaçao, both part of the ABC Islands in the Dutch Caribbean. Due to past situations, the family took on their maternal name Timber instead of taking the last name of their father Maduro. The twins also have three older brothers Shamier, Chris, and Dylan.

Career statistics

Club

International

Honours
Ajax
 Eredivisie: 2020–21, 2021–22
 KNVB Cup: 2020–21

Netherlands U17
 UEFA European Under-17 Championship: 2018

Individual
 Curaçao Player of the Year: 2021
 Eredivisie Player of the Year:  2021–22
 Eredivisie Talent of the Year:  2021–22
 Eredivisie Talent of the Month: April 2021,September 2021, November 2021
 Ajax Talent of the Year (Marco van Basten Award): 2021–22

References

External links
 Profile at the AFC Ajax website
 Career stats - Voetbal International

2001 births
Living people
Footballers from Utrecht (city)
Dutch footballers
Association football defenders
Eredivisie players
Eerste Divisie players
AFC Ajax players
Jong Ajax players
Netherlands youth international footballers
Netherlands under-21 international footballers
Netherlands international footballers
UEFA Euro 2020 players
2022 FIFA World Cup players
Dutch people of Aruban descent
Dutch people of Curaçao descent
Dutch twins
Identical twins
Twin sportspeople